Atika bint Shuhda was an 8th-century Arabian Qiyan-courtesan musician, composer, singer and poet. 

She was born in Medina, but settled in Basra. She was the daughter of Shuhda, a female professional singer and mourner from Mecca who was herself a slave-singer for the Umayyad caliph al-Walid II ibn Yazid (r. 743–744). Atika was particularly noted for her ability as a lute-player, and was described by Ishaq al-Mawsili (d. 850) as the most skilled oud player he had ever heard. She is also known to setting lyrics by Umar ibn Abi Rabi'ah to music. Atika also acted as the instructor of other slave singers, and known as the teacher of the noted musicians Ishaq al-Mawsili and Mukhariq ibn Yahya.

References

8th-century women musicians
Arabian slaves and freedmen
Qiyan
Slaves from the Abbasid Caliphate
8th-century women from the Abbasid Caliphate
8th-century Arabs
People from Medina
Medieval Arabic singers